Claus Christiansen (born 19 October 1967 in Glostrup) is a Danish former football (soccer) player in a defender role, who played 295 Danish league matches for Lyngby Boldklub. He played five matches for the Denmark national football team, most notably the semi-final and final game of the Euro 1992 tournament which Denmark won.

References

External links
Danish national team profile

1967 births
Living people
Danish men's footballers
Denmark international footballers
Denmark under-21 international footballers
Association football defenders
Danish football managers
Lyngby Boldklub players
UEFA Euro 1992 players
UEFA European Championship-winning players
People from Glostrup Municipality
Sportspeople from the Capital Region of Denmark